Progress M-07M, identified by NASA as Progress 39P, is a Progress spacecraft which was used to resupply the International Space Station. It was the seventh Progress-M 11F615A60 spacecraft to be launched, the fourth for the year 2010 and has the serial number 407. The spacecraft was manufactured by RKK Energia, and is being operated by the Russian Federal Space Agency. It arrived at the space station whilst the Expedition 24 crew was aboard, and will remain docked for the entirety of Expedition 25, before departing during Expedition 26.

Launch and docking

Progress M-07M was launched by a Soyuz-U carrier rocket, flying from Site 31/6 at the Baikonur Cosmodrome. The launch occurred at 10:22:28 UTC on 10 September 2010. The launch had previously been scheduled to occur at 11:11 UTC on 8 September 2010, however it was delayed due to unfavorable weather conditions. A series of engine firings over the next two days guided Progress M-07M to the rendezvous.

Docking with the aft port of the Zvezda module of the ISS had been scheduled for around 12:37 UTC on 10 September 2010, however due to the launch delay, it occurred on 12 September at 11:58 UTC. The docking was executed flawlessly by the Kurs automated rendezvous system.

Cargo
Progress M-07M carried  of cargo to the International Space Station. The remaining  was dry cargo, including components for the station's life support system, equipment for conducting maintenance and repairs, supplies for sanitation and hygiene, food, medical equipment, clothes and parcels for the cosmonauts aboard the station, cameras, and supplies for outfitting the Zarya, Poisk and Rassvet modules.

Orbit raising manoeuvres
Progress M-07M was used for three manoeuvres to raise the orbit of the International Space Station. The first, which used eight of the Progress spacecraft's attitude control thrusters, was carried out on 15 September 2010.

A second orbit raising manoeuvre was conducted at 19:41 UTC on 20 October 2010, in preparation for the docking of Progress M-08M. Progress M-08M was launched on 27 October 2010, and successfully docked two days later.

The third manoeuvre was conducted on 22 December 2010, when eight thrusters were again used to raise the space station's orbit.

Undocking 
It remained docked to the space station until 20 February 2011 when it undocked to make way for the Johannes Kepler Automated Transfer Vehicle. After undocking, it was deorbited to a destructive reentry over the spacecraft cemetery in the Pacific Ocean. Filled with trash and spent equipment on board the ISS, Progress M-07M drowned in the Pacific Ocean at 19:58 Moscow time.

See also 

 2010 in spaceflight
 List of Progress flights
 Uncrewed spaceflights to the International Space Station

References 

Spacecraft launched in 2010
Progress (spacecraft) missions
Spacecraft which reentered in 2011
Supply vehicles for the International Space Station
Spacecraft launched by Soyuz-U rockets